Patrick Kenny (born 17 August 1934) is an Irish boxer. He competed in the men's bantamweight event at the 1960 Summer Olympics.

References

1934 births
Living people
Irish male boxers
Olympic boxers of Ireland
Boxers at the 1960 Summer Olympics
Sportspeople from Cork (city)
Bantamweight boxers